Hemimyzon yaotanensis is a species of ray-finned fish in the genus Hemimyzon.

Information
The Hemimyzon yaotanensis is known to be found in a freshwater environment within a demersal range. They are native to a temperate climate. The average length of a Hemimyzon yaotanensis as an unsexed male is about 8.4 centimeters or about 3.3 inches. This species can be found in the areas of Asia, Jinsha-jiang basin in Sichuan, and China.

References

Footnotes 
 

Hemimyzon
Fish described in 1931